Wilhelm Heckel GmbH is a manufacturer of woodwind instruments based in Wiesbaden, Germany. It is best known for its bassoons, which are considered some of the finest available.The company was established in 1831 by the instrument maker Johann Adam Heckel. It remains a family-owned business.

Wilhelm Heckel is also known for its production of contrabassoons and heckelphones. It also formerly produced oboes, piccolo heckelphones, and heckel-clarinas.

References

External links

Companies based in Wiesbaden
musical instrument manufacturing companies of Germany
Manufacturing companies established in 1831
1831 establishments in the Duchy of Nassau